Anthicus floralis, the narrownecked grain beetle, is a beetle species.

References

Anthicidae
Beetles described in 1758
Taxa named by Carl Linnaeus